Franklin-Simpson High School is a high school in Franklin, Kentucky, United States. Franklin-Simpson is the only high school located in Simpson County, Kentucky. As of 2016, the school has 916 students enrolled and has 52 full-time teachers. The school was built in the 1960s to replace the old high school in Franklin.The school ranks 13th in Kentucky academically. Franklin-Simpson also boasts a very successful athletic department, with them constantly being a threat to win district, Regional, and even State Titles. Franklin-Simpson has been in the top 20 in the Kentucky state academic rankings since 2014.

Athletics
Franklin-Simpson in athletics are known as the Wildcats and Lady Cats. The school colors are Blue and White. Overall, they have five total State titles to boast, four in football (1979, 1980, 2017 and 2018) and one in baseball (1991).

Football: The FSHS Wildcat football team has long been a historic power in southern Kentucky football. Consistently winning local district titles, regional titles, and making deep runs in the KHSAA Football playoffs.

Notable alumni
Joe Blanton, baseball player
Annie Potts, American actress

References

External links
 

Public high schools in Kentucky
Education in Simpson County, Kentucky
Buildings and structures in Simpson County, Kentucky
Franklin, Kentucky